Yuri Vladimirovich Vlasenko (born 20 November 1994) is a Russian ice dancer. With former partner Betina Popova, he is the 2014–15 JGP Final bronze medalist.

Personal life 
Yuri Vladimirovich Vlasenko was born on 20 November 1994 in Kharkiv, Ukraine.

Career 
Vlasenko and Betina Popova began competing together in 2009. The two were coached by Ksenia Rumiantseva and Ekaterina Zhurina at the Sambo-70 club in Moscow.

Popova/Vlasenko's international debut came at the 2011 NRW Trophy. They placed 7th at the Russian Junior Championships in the 2012–13 season.

2013–14 season 
Popova/Vlasenko made their ISU Junior Grand Prix debut in the 2013–14 season. They won the silver medal in Minsk, Belarus and then gold in Ostrava, Czech Republic. Their results qualified them for the JGP Final in Fukuoka, Japan, where they placed fourth. After taking the bronze medal at the 2014 Russian Junior Championships, the two were assigned to the 2014 World Junior Championships and finished seventh in Sofia, Bulgaria.

2014–15 season 
Popova/Vlasenko's first assignment of the 2014–15 JGP season was in Ostrava, Czech Republic. Ranked second in the short dance and fourth in the free dance, they finished second to Canada's Mackenzie Bent / Garrett MacKeen by a margin of 6.75 points. Popova/Vlasenko were awarded gold in Dresden, Germany after placing first in both segments and outscoring Lorraine McNamara / Quinn Carpenter of the United States by 7.96 points. At the 2014–15 JGP Final in Barcelona, they won the bronze medal behind Alla Loboda / Pavel Drozd. The two finished 11th at the 2015 World Junior Championships in Tallinn, Estonia.

2015–16 season 
Competing in the 2015–16 JGP series, Popova/Vlasenko outscored Angélique Abachkina / Louis Thauron of France by 7.3 points for the gold in Riga, Latvia. They took silver at their JGP assignment in Logroño, Spain – finishing second to another French team, Marie-Jade Lauriault / Romain Le Gac, by a margin of 1.78 points – and qualified for their third JGP Final. At the final, held in December in Barcelona, Popova/Vlasenko finished fourth, having scored 0.45 less than the bronze medalists, Rachel Parsons / Michael Parsons of the United States. After taking silver behind Loboda/Drozd at the Russian Junior Championships, they were assigned to the World Junior Championships in Debrecen, Hungary.

Their partnership ended by May 2016.

Programs 
(with Popova)

Competitive highlights 
CS: Challenger Series; JGP: Junior Grand Prix

With Erdman

With Solovieva

With Popova

Detailed results
Small medals for short and free programs awarded only at ISU Championships. At team events, medals awarded for team results only.

With Popova

References

External links 

 

1994 births
Russian male ice dancers
Living people
Sportspeople from Kharkiv
Ukrainian emigrants to Russia